Tomáš Bobček (born 8 September 2001) is a Slovak professional footballer who plays for Ružomberok as a forward.

Club career

MFK Ružomberok
Bobček made his Fortuna Liga debut for Ružomberok against Zemplín Michalovce on 2 March 2019. The match concluded in a goal-less tie with Bobček replacing Ismar Tandir in the 68th minute as an attempt to break the deadlock.

International career
Bobček was first recognised in a senior national team nomination on 23 May 2022 Štefan Tarkovič  as an alternate ahead of four UEFA Nations League fixtures against Belarus, Azerbaijan and Kazakhstan. For the same June fixtures, he was also a member of U21 team ahead of a qualifier against Malta and a friendly against Romania. After Tarkovič's dismissal and arrival of Francesco Calzona Bobček was initially omitted from nominations, even as an alternate, but penetrated the shortlisted nomination for December 2022 national team prospective players' training camp at NTC Senec.

References

External links
 MFK Ružomberok official profile 
 Futbalnet profile 
 
 

2001 births
Living people
Sportspeople from Ružomberok
Slovak footballers
Slovakia youth international footballers
Association football forwards
MFK Ružomberok players
3. Liga (Slovakia) players
2. Liga (Slovakia) players
Slovak Super Liga players